Bid-e Zard (also Romanized as Bīd-e Zard) is a village in Miyan Deh Rural District, Shibkaveh District, Fasa County, Fars Province, Iran. At the 2006 census, its population was 683, in 134 families.

References 

Populated places in Fasa County